Storage capacity can refer to

 Thermal electric capacity mostly referring to solar power plants
 Energy storage capacity
 Depression storage capacity, in soil science
 Computer data storage capacity, in computing
 Native capacity, the apparent storage capacity may differ due to compression